Jordan Christian John Piggott (born 17 February 1999) is an English professional footballer who plays as a defender for AFC Telford United, on loan from Solihull Moors.

Club career

Dundee
On 28 July 2017, Piggott signed for Dundee after being released by West Bromwich Albion. On 21 October 2017, he joined East Fife on an emergency loan until January 2018. Piggott made his debut for Dundee in the Scottish Premiership in a 4–0 loss to St Johnstone on 10 March 2018. He came on as a sub in the 18th minute, and had a shot deflected off of him for an own goal in the 24th minute. He was released by Dundee at the end of the season.

Bangor City
On 12 October 2018, Piggott joined Welsh second division side Bangor City, after having to wait six weeks for international clearance to sign a deal.

Later career
In August 2018, Piggott played for Alvechurch FC.

In the summer 2019, Piggott joined Halesowen Town. In September 2019 it was reported that he had joined Sutton Coldfield, probably only on a dual registration.

In the summer of 2020, Piggott signed for National League side Solihull Moors. On 4 August 2021, Piggott joined National League North side Gloucester City on loan until 5 January 2022. On 11 January 2022, Piggott joined National League North side AFC Telford United on a short-term loan deal until 8 February 2022.

Career statistics

References

External links
 
 Dundee FC profile
 Fox Sports profile
 
 Jordan Piggott at Aylesbury United

1999 births
Living people
People from Sandwell (district)
English footballers
West Bromwich Albion F.C. players
Dundee F.C. players
East Fife F.C. players
Bangor City F.C. players
Alvechurch F.C. players
Halesowen Town F.C. players
Sutton Coldfield Town F.C. players
Solihull Moors F.C. players
Scottish Professional Football League players
National League (English football) players
Association football defenders
Gloucester City A.F.C. players
AFC Telford United players